Erlan Jaqanūly Qoşanov (born 14 August 1962) is a Kazakh politician who is serving as the Chairman of the Mazhilis since 1 February 2022. Prior to that, he headed the Presidential Administration of Kazakhstan under Tokayev from 18 September 2019 and several posts such as the äkim of Karaganda Region from 14 March 2017 to 18 September 2019 and the head of the Prime Minister's Office from 2 February 2012 to 14 March 2017. On March 14, 2017 he was appointed Akim of the Karaganda region.

Biography

Early life and education 
Qoşanov was born in the village of Aqsu-Aiuly. In 1984, he graduated from the Dzhezkazgan branch of the Karaganda State Technical University with a degree in mechanical engineering and then in 1991, from the Higher Commercial School at the All-Russian Academy of Foreign Trade. In 1999, Qoşanov graduated from the Narxoz University with a degree in economics. He also served in the ranks of the Soviet Army.

Early career 
From 1986 to 1988, Qoşanov worked as a mechanic, then as a foreman at the Dzhezkazgantsvetmet concentration plant. In 1988, he became an instructor of the Dzhezkazgan Regional Committee of the Lenin Communist Youth Union of Kazakhstan. From 1990, Qoşanov was the leading, chief specialist, head of department, deputy chairman, and then the chairman of the Jezkazgan Regional Committee for Wind Farm.

Political career 
In 1995, he became the Secretary of the Jezkazgan Regional Committee of the Democratic Party of Kazakhstan and in December 1995, Qoşanov was elected as a member of the Senate of Kazakhstan. He served the post until he was appointed as a representative of the Government in the Parliament of Kazakhstan in February 1999.

From November 2001 to June 2003, Qoşanov was the Deputy Head of the Prime Minister's Office until he was appointed as Vice Minister of Transport and Communications of the Republic of Kazakhstan. In February 2006, he was appointed as the Chairman of the Civil Aviation Committee of the Ministry of Transport and Communications. From 2007, he served as the Deputy Head of the Prime Minister's Office and a representative of the Government in the Mazhilis.

On 2 February 2012, Qoşanov was appointed as the head of Prime Minister's Office. He served the post until he was appointed as the äkim of Karaganda Region on 14 March 2017. From 18 September 2019, he worked as chief of staff in the Presidential Administration of Kazakhstan under Kassym-Jomart Tokayev.

Chairman of the Mazhilis (2022–present) 
Following resignation of Nurlan Nigmatulin from the chairman of Mazhilis, Qoşanov became a member for the lower house Parliament and was subsequently elected as the new chairman on 1 February 2022. Qoşanov's nomination was proposed by Nur Otan MP Erlan Sairov who noted his experience in many fields including legislation while Qoşanov himself at the hearing thanked the support, stressing that President Tokayev's proposed reforms is "is our common task."

On 14 February 2022, Qoşanov was elected as the parliamentary leader of Nur Otan. From there, he stressed that the party should be actively involved in its transformation by fully contributing to increasing the effectiveness to carry out the presidential course of reforms. He also instructed for the Mazhilis to strengthen the quality of legislative activity, increase the relevance of lawmakers' requests, and strengthen interaction with the Nur Otan Central Office on analytics and work in the regions.

Since April 26, 2022, he has been appointed chairman of the Amanat Party.

References 

1962 births
Living people
People from Karaganda Region
Nur Otan politicians
Members of the Senate of Kazakhstan
Narxoz University alumni